Ovidio Guzmán López (born 29 March 1990) is a Mexican drug lord and high-ranking member of the Sinaloa Cartel, a criminal group based in the state of Sinaloa. He is the son of infamous drug lord Joaquín "El Chapo" Guzmán, once considered Mexico's most-wanted drug lord and the world's most-wanted criminal. Guzmán López was suspected of being a leader within a Sinaloa Cartel faction often referred to as Los Chapitos, Los Menores, and/or Los Juniors. He was captured on 5 January 2023 and remanded to Federal Social Readaptation Center No. 1.

Early life
Guzmán López was born 29 March 1990 and is a son of Joaquín "El Chapo" Guzmán with his second wife. He was raised in Mexico City and spent four years of his education at a school run by the Legionaries of Christ. This biography states that Guzmán López's mother took him out of the school when the families of his classmates excluded him from a school trip.

A U.S. grand jury indictment alleges Guzmán López has been involved in his father's drug trafficking business since 2008, when he was a teenager.

Career
The Office of Foreign Assets Control (OFAC) of the United States Department of the Treasury named him a "Key Lieutenant" of his father and the Sinaloa Cartel in a 2012 sanctions Foreign Narcotics Kingpin Designation Act ("Kingpin Act").

It is widely reported that Guzmán López took on a prominent role of the Sinaloa Cartel after his father's arrest. In 2019, the Associated Press reported that he leads the cartel along with his brothers Iván Archivaldo Guzmán, Jesús Alfredo Guzmán, and Ismael "El Mayo" Zambada.

In July 2017, the United States Attorney for the District of Columbia empaneled a grand jury that formally indicted both Ovidio Guzmán López and his brother Joaquín Guzmán López on charges of participating in a conspiracy to traffic cocaine, methamphetamine and marijuana since 2008. The sealed indictment was filed 2 April 2018.

On 12 December 2018, the indictment was unsealed for the limited purpose of disclosure in an extradition proceeding pursuant to the Jencks Act. Judge Rudolph Contreras ordered the full unsealing of the indictment on 13 February 2019.

2019 capture and release

On 17 October 2019, members of the National Guard briefly arrested Ovidio Guzmán López in Culiacán, Sinaloa, setting off several gun battles in the city. Heavily armed cartel gunmen (numbering over 700) threatened mass civilian deaths, including an attack to the apartment complex housing the relatives of the local military personnel.  Hours later, Ovidio Guzmán was freed, with President Andrés Manuel López Obrador saying he supported the decision in order to "prevent more bloodshed". The next month, however, one of the officers who arrested Ovidio, identified as Eduardo N., was assassinated.

On 8 May 2020, Santiago Nieto, head of Mexico's Financial Intelligence Unit (UIF), confirmed that the Government of Mexico froze Ovidio Guzmán's assets, stating, "We have frozen the accounts of Ovidio and of 330 people linked to the cartel and have filed a complaint with the Prosecutor's Office. We have also found irregularities."

2023 recapture
On 5 January 2023, the authorities arrested Guzmán López in the Jesús María district of Culiacán. According to eyewitness accounts, Guzmán López had a family party the evening before he was arrested. The military executed a pre-dawn raid on Guzmán López's residence that used a helicopter and convoy of ground vehicles and apprehended him within 10 minutes of entry.

Reports of his arrest were later confirmed by Defense Secretary Luis Cresencio Sandoval, who stated that personnel from the Army, National Guard, Secretariat of National Defense and Secretariat of the Navy had captured him and also managed to successfully transport him to Mexico City, where he was then taken to offices of the Attorney General’s organized crime special prosecutor.

The Air Force then flew Guzmán López by helicopter to the Federal Social Readaptation Center No. 1 ("Altiplano"), a maximum security federal prison in Almoloya de Juárez, later that afternoon. An additional 17 suspected cartel members were also taken into custody in the initial operation.

In a press conference, Foreign Secretary Marcelo Ebrard confirmed that there was an extradition request for Guzmán López to face trial in the United States, but Ebrard noted that he was also facing criminal charges in Mexico. The day after his arrest, a federal judge placed Guzmán López under a 60-day preventive detention to allow U.S. authorities to formally petition for his extradition.

Violence in Sinaloa and Sonora 

Following the arrest, the U.S. Consulate in Hermosillo shared that it had received reports of gunfire, roadblocks, and fires throughout the cities of Culiacán, Los Mochis, and Guasave. The Consulate reiterated the United States Department of State's highest level of travel advisory cautioning against travel to Sinaloa. Sinaloa Governor Rubén Rocha Moya called for the public to shelter in place.

Unrest led to the closure of Culiacán International Airport as two planes at the airport—an airliner operated by Aeroméxico and a military aircraft—took gunfire. Shootouts were also reported on the runway. Aeroméxico diverted planes away from the international airports in Los Mochis and Mazatlán as well. Attacks on two trucks on Highway 15 in neighboring Sonora prompted Aeroméxico to also cancel flights from Ciudad Obregón International Airport. Regular service at all the affected airports was restored during the morning of 6 January.

Looting was reported in parts of Culiacán, and numerous businesses and banks announced temporary closures across the state. Journalists in the area reported multiple carjackings and demands for car keys.

Ten soldiers, 19 gang members, and one police officer were killed during the unrest. Among the victims were an infantry colonel and his four escorts, who were ambushed and killed by cartel members in Escuinapa, Sinaloa.

A report issued by the Secretariat of National Defense put the forces used in the operation at 3,586 soldiers. The Secretariat also claimed that in the course of the operation "four .50 caliber Barrett rifles, six 50 caliber machine guns, 26 long arms, 2 handguns, magazines, cartridges, various tactical equipment and 13 operational vehicles" were seized

Post-recapture 

Following Guzmán López's capture, the U.S. Office of Foreign Assets Control applied sanctions pursuant to  against individuals and corporations of Sinaloa Cartel's networks supplying drug precursors for illicit manufacture of methamphetamine and fentanyl in so-called super-laboratories. These are defined by OFAC as "large-scale drug laboratories that produce 10 or more pounds of an illicit drug per production cycle". The targets included Luis Gerardo Flores Madrid, said to be a subordinate of Guzmán López.

A parallel press announcement by U.S. Secretary of State Antony Blinken described the sanctions as "part of a whole-of-government effort to disrupt and dismantle the transnational criminal organizations that facilitate the illicit supply of fentanyl and other narcotics".

On the same day as these announcements, the docket of the U.S. criminal case against Guzmán López was updated, with the trial attorney of the Narcotic and Dangerous Drug Section of the Department of Justice substituting as Government counsel of record.

On 28 February 2023, CBS News, Agence France-Presse, and Reuters quoted unnamed sources in the Mexican government as stating that the United States has formally requested Guzmán López's extradition.

See also
 Mexican Drug War

References

1990 births
Living people
People from Culiacán
Mexican crime bosses
Sinaloa Cartel traffickers
People of the Mexican Drug War
People sanctioned under the Foreign Narcotics Kingpin Designation Act
Prisoners and detainees of Mexico
Fugitives wanted by Mexico
Fugitives wanted by the United States
Fugitives wanted on organised crime charges
20th-century Mexican people
21st-century Mexican criminals
21st-century criminals